The 2020–21 season is the 122nd season of the English Football League (EFL) and the fifth season under that name after it was renamed from The Football League in 2016. For the eighth season running, the league was sponsored by Sky Betting & Gaming and therefore known as the Sky Bet EFL.

The EFL is contested through three divisions: the Championship, League One and League Two. The winner and the runner up of the Championship were automatically promoted to the Premier League and they were joined by the winner of the Championship playoff. The bottom two teams in League Two were relegated to the National League.

This season marked the extension by another two years of the league's partnership with official charity Mind. The mental health charity had its logo displayed on the shirts of all EFL clubs and worked with the EFL to promote mental health within football and the wider community.

Promotion and relegation

From the Premier League
 Relegated to the Championship
 Bournemouth
 Watford
 Norwich City

From the Championship
 Promoted to the Premier League
Leeds United
West Bromwich Albion
Fulham
 Relegated to League One
 Charlton Athletic
 Wigan Athletic
 Hull City

From League One
 Promoted to the Championship
 Coventry City
 Rotherham United
 Wycombe Wanderers
 Relegated to League Two
Tranmere Rovers
Southend United
Bolton Wanderers

From League Two
 Promoted to League One
 Swindon Town
 Crewe Alexandra
 Plymouth Argyle
 Northampton Town
 Relegated to the National League
Macclesfield Town

From the National League
 Promoted to League Two
Barrow
Harrogate Town

Championship

Table

Play-offs

Results

League One

Table

Play-offs

Results

League Two

Table

Play-offs

Results

Managerial changes

References

 
2020-21